Violin is the first album released by violinist Vanessa-Mae. It was recorded in October 1990, near her 12th birthday, and released shortly afterwards in March 1991. Vanessa-Mae contributed her royalties from the album to the National Society for the Prevention of Cruelty to Children.

For the recording, she performed with the Mozart Players as conducted by Anthony Inglis.

Track listing
Sarasate
Carmen Fantasy13:35
KabalevskyViolin Concerto 
Allegro4:24 
Andante5:01 
Vivace Giocoso5:51

Mozart"Adelaide" Concerto
Allegro7:21 
Adagio7:11 
Allegro4:22

Wieniawski
Faust Fantasy16:20

1991 debut albums
1991 classical albums
Vanessa-Mae albums